"Celebrate" is a song by Australian electronic music duo Empire of the Sun. It was released as the third and final single from their second studio album, Ice on the Dune, on 14 February 2014. It was co-written by the band's members Luke Steele and Nick Littlemore with Daniel Johns, Peter Mayes and Scott Horscroft. It was remixed by various artists and two digital remixes were released in February.

Reception

Marissa Muller from Rolling Stone called the song "the highlight" from the Ice on the Dune album.

Music video

The music video was filmed in South Korea in 2014 and saw Luke Steele walking around the streets of Seoul.

James Grebey from Spin magazine said: "It's a pretty upbeat look for a pretty upbeat song."

Track listing

 "Celebrate" (radio mix) – 3:25
 "Celebrate" (Tommy Trash Club Mix) – 5:37
 "Celebrate" (Steve Aoki Remix) – 4:30

References

Empire of the Sun (band) songs
2013 songs
2014 singles
Capitol Records singles
Songs written by Luke Steele (musician)
Songs written by Nick Littlemore
Songs written by Peter Mayes